Pellonulinae is a subfamily of freshwater herrings belonging to the family Clupeidae. Extant species are found in Asia, Africa and Australia, and members of the family occurred in North America in the Eocene.

References 

Clupeidae
Seafood
Commercial fish
Oily fish
Fish subfamilies